Pennsylvania State Senate District 22 includes parts of Lackawanna County and Luzerne County. It is currently represented by Democrat Marty Flynn.

District profile
The district includes the following areas:

Lackawanna County

 Benton Township
 Clarks Green
 Clarks Summit
 Dalton
 Dickson City
 Dunmore
 Glenburn Township
 Greenfield Township
 La Plume Township
 Moosic
 Newton Township
 North Abington Township
 Old Forge
 Ransom Township
 Scott Township
 Scranton
 South Abington Township
 Taylor
 Throop
 Waverly Township
 West Abington Township

Luzerne County

 Avoca
 Dupont
 Duryea
 Hughestown
 Jenkins Township
 Laflin
 Laurel Run
 Pittston
 Pittston Township
 Plains Township
 West Pittston
 Wilkes-Barre
 Wilkes-Barre
 Wyoming
 Yatesville

Popular culture
This seat is the one represented by Robert Lipton and later competed for by Oscar Martinez on NBC's hit show The Office.

Senators

References

 

Pennsylvania Senate districts
Government of Lackawanna County, Pennsylvania
Government of Luzerne County, Pennsylvania
Government of Monroe County, Pennsylvania